This is the progression of world record improvements of the pole vault W75 division of Masters athletics.

Key

References

Masters Athletics Pole Vault list

Masters athletics world record progressions
Pole